Atrimitra is a genus of sea snails, marine gastropod mollusks in the family Mitridae.

Species
Species within the genus Atrimitra include:
 Atrimitra caliginosa 
 Atrimitra catalinae 
 Atrimitra effusa 
 Atrimitra idae 
 Atrimitra orientalis 
 Atrimitra semigranosa

References

Mitridae
Gastropod genera